The International Bomber Command Centre (IBCC) is a memorial and interpretation centre telling the story of Bomber Command overlooking the city of Lincoln, in England. The centre opened to the public at the end of January 2018. The official opening ceremony was held on 12 April 2018, as part of the 100th anniversary celebrations of the RAF.

Lincolnshire Bomber Command Memorial

Objectives
The project was created to act as a point of "recognition, remembrance and reconciliation for Bomber Command".

IBCC aims to tell the personal stories of service men and women of RAF Bomber Command, ground crews and civilians affected by the bombing campaigns on both sides of the conflict during the Second World War and beyond to the Cold War era. The centre provides a comprehensive record of the role of Bomber Command's squadrons and digitally displays historical documents and photographs relating to the activity of Bomber Command, in an interactive and immersive exhibition.

IBCC Digital Archive
The IBCC has created a digital archive on Bomber Command in partnership with the University of Lincoln. The IBCC Digital Archive focuses on people’s stories of RAF Bomber Command and the bombing war in Europe, 1939-1945, from multiple perspectives: on the ground and in the air, military and civilian, and on both sides of the conflict. Much of the archive has never been available for public access before.

Losses Database

The IBCC has a comprehensive record of Bomber Command Losses.  It holds the records of all losses from 1936 - 1968 and includes details of the individual, their crew, details of how they were lost and, where available, photographs, epitaphs and AIR records.

Canwick Hill site

Location
Located on Canwick Hill, the centre is just under two and half miles from RAF Waddington, which suffered the greatest losses of any Bomber Command station, and close to the former Avro aircraft production facility at Bracebridge Heath. A view of Lincoln Cathedral, a prominent landmark for aircrews, forms an important part of the vista from the centre of the Memorial Spire.

Spire Memorial
Within the grounds of the International Bomber Command Centre sits the Spire Memorial, which was erected on 10 May 2015.

Gallery

See also 
 RAF Bomber Command Memorial

References

External links
 International Bomber Command Centre official site
 International Bomber Command Centre Digital Archive
 Lancaster bomber flypast, 2016
 BBC News article featuring aerial view of IBCC

Royal Air Force memorials
Buildings and structures in Lincoln, England
British military memorials and cemeteries
World War II memorials in England